Polymitia laristana is a moth of the family Gracillariidae. It is known from Iran, the type locality is southern Iran, just north of Bandar Abbas.

References

Gracillariinae
Moths of the Middle East
Moths described in 1986